Slaviša Dvorančič (born 22 January 1979) is Slovenian football striker from Veliki Podlog. He played for Domžale, Celje, Nafta Lendava, Bela Krajina and Krško. At the beginning of his Senior career, Dvorančič played for Steklar from Rogaška Slatina and then for Brežice. His last club before returning to his parent club in July 2012 was Krka. He played 134 games, and give 41 goals in Slovenian 1.league. Dvorančič is now manager by Slovenian club NK Brezice 1919 in Slovenian Second League (2 SNL).

External links
Player profile at PrvaLiga 

1979 births
Living people
People from Brežice
Slovenian footballers
Association football forwards
NK Domžale players
NK Celje players
NK Ivančna Gorica players
NK Nafta Lendava players
NK Krško players
NK Krka players
Slovenian PrvaLiga players